Haitian Americans are a group of Americans of full or partial Haitian origin or descent. The largest proportion of Haitians in the United States live in Little Haiti to the South Florida area. In addition, they have settled in major Northeast cities such as New York City, Boston, Philadelphia, Baltimore and Washington, D.C. and in Chicago and Detroit in the Midwest. Most are immigrants or their descendants from the mid-late 20th-century migrations to the United States. Haitian Americans represent the largest group within the Haitian diaspora. 

In 2018 the U.S. Census estimated that 1,084,055 people of full or partial Haitian descent lived in the United States. During the 1960s and 1970s many Haitians emigrated to the U.S. to escape the oppressive conditions during the dictatorships of François "Papa Doc" and his son Jean-Claude "Baby Doc" Duvalier. Political unrest, economic strains and natural disasters have supplied additional reasons for people to emigrate.

History 
During the 18th century, the French colony of Saint-Domingue was the richest in the Caribbean, due to its massive production of sugar cane. This wealth was concentrated in the hands of a small minority of mostly French and European planters, who used slave labor from Sub-Saharan Africa to cultivate, harvest, and process their crops. Beginning in 1791, slaves (who formed about 90 percent of the population) revolted against their masters, fought against invading forces, and succeeded in forcing France to abolish slavery.

When France attempted later to reintroduce slavery, the former slaves again revolted and won their independence in 1804, declaring the Republic of Haiti, the second republic in the Western Hemisphere. The rebellion proved disruptive to the country's economy, however. Many wealthy colonists left, both white and free people of color. The freedmen wanted to cultivate their own plots rather than work on plantations. Many refugees from Saint-Domingue emigrated to the United States, taking their slaves with them, particularly to the New Orleans region, where they reinforced the existing French-speaking and African populations. Though France and the Spanish-speaking Caribbean (Cuba, Santo Domingo and Puerto Rico) were other major destinations for many immigrants, the United States was a much more popular destination.

During the early 19th century, many Saint Dominican refugees  helped found settlements in the French Empire, which would be later be the sites of Chicago and Detroit in modern day United States. During the Haitian revolution, many Saint Dominicans left Saint-Domingue for the New Orleans region, because of its strong French connection, despite being a part of the United States by then. They brought slaves with them, an action which doubled the black population in the New Orleans region. Saint Dominican influence includes, that of Saint Dominican Creole French on the Louisiana Creole language and Haitian Vodou on the Louisiana Voodoo religion.

While most of the early 20th-century emigrants from Haiti were from the upper classes, persistent conditions of poverty, as well as political unrest, eventually prodded many lower-class Saint Dominicans to emigrate as well. Altogether, there have been four periods of major migration to the United States in the history of Haiti: the initial wave at the turn of the 20th century, following the U.S. occupation from the 1915 to 1934, during the 1960s and 1970s to escape the Duvalier regime, and following the 2004 overthrow of Jean-Bertrand Aristide.

20th century 
Between 1957 and 1986, when the Duvaliers ruled Haiti, their political persecution of the opposition and suspected activists resulted in many Haitian professionals, the middle class, and students to emigrate to others countries, among them the United States, France, Dominican Republic and Canada (primarily Montreal). Between 1972 and 1977, 200,000 Haitians landed in South Florida, many of them settling in the neighborhood of Little Haiti.

In the late 20th century, there was a significant brain drain from Haiti as thousands of doctors, teachers, social workers and entrepreneurs emigrated to several cities of East, particularly to New York City and Miami. Other Haitians worked in restaurants and music stores. In the early 1980s, 40,000 Haitians who came to the United States seeking political asylum achieved permanent resident status. In 1991, there was another wave of Haitian emigration by boat. But the administration of President Bill Clinton tried to discourage Haitian immigration. People were either detained and/or sent back to Haiti. Still, between 1995 and 1998, 50,000 Haitians obtained temporary legal status.

Immigration today
Political strife, marked with corruption, and intimidation led to many Haitians leaving the island for an opportunity of a better life. In addition, most of the migrants were from the poor masses; vast disparities existed between the Haitian wealthy elite and the poor. Suffering from less education, many have had difficulty flourishing in the United States. Waves of Haitians made it to the shores of Florida seeking asylum. Most of the foreign-born Haitians arrived during the mid to late 20th century

Today, Florida has the largest number of people of Haitian heritage. In 2000, Florida had 182,224 foreign-born Haitians, 43.5% of the total foreign-born population from Haiti in the United States (this number did not include U.S. citizens of Haitian heritage). New York had the second-largest population of foreign-born Haitians, with 125,475, approximately 30% of the total. Haitian illegal immigrants continue to attempt to reach the shores of Florida and are routinely swept up by the United States Coast Guard; they are often repatriated. Civil rights groups have protested this treatment, remarking on the contrast to the asylum granted between the late 1950s and January 2017 to Cuban refugees.

Culture

Language and religion 
Most recent Haitian immigrants speak Haitian Creole and are either familiar with, or learn English. In Haiti, although French is an official language it is not widely spoken and understood. Most Haitians speak Creole in daily life. (More than 90% of its vocabulary is of French origin, with some influences from Taíno, West African languages, Portuguese and Spanish languages; however, its grammar and other features are of West African origin). Most native-born Haitian Americans speak English fluently, as do many immigrants. Many Spanish speaking countries like Cuba and Dominican Republic have significant Haitian populations, many Haitians who have lived there before moving to the United States, have some knowledge of the Spanish language, if not fluent.

Most Haitian Americans are Roman Catholic, with Protestant communities being the second largest religious group. There are also communities of Mormons and Jehovah's Witnesses. Some individuals practice Vodoun, even when they officially follow one of the main religious groups.  Religion is very important in the life of Haitian Americans.

Adjustment and communities 
The Haitians who emigrated to the United States brought many of their cultural practices and ideologies, as do all immigrants. Many foreign-born Haitians have set up their own businesses, initially to serve their communities. Thus, many established barbershops, bodegas and restaurants (predominately of Haitian cuisine). Haitian Americans have a visible cultural presence in Little Haiti, Miami and several nearby communities, such as Golden Glades and North Miami. The northern portions of the Miami metropolitan area have the highest concentrations of Haitians in the country, including Broward County and northern Miami-Dade County. 

Other significant Haitian-American communities are found in several neighborhoods of New York City, such as Flatbush (Nostrand), Crown Heights, Flatlands, East Flatbush, Canarsie and Bedford-Stuyvesant in Brooklyn, Queens Village, Springfield Gardens, Laurelton and Rosedale in Queens, as well as Long Island and Rockland. However, Central Brooklyn, especially the Flatbush section, has the largest Haitian concentration in the NYC area, and the 2nd largest in the country outside South Florida. In 2018, a section of Flatbush, Brooklyn that stretches from East 16th Street, to Parkside Avenue, to Brooklyn Avenue, and along Church Avenue between East 16th Street and Albany Avenue, was designated Little Haiti. Assemblymember Rodneyse Bichotte was the 'driving force' behind the successful designation of the Little Haiti Cultural and Business District. Following the designation of Little Haiti, thirty blocks of Rogers Avenue between Farragut Road and Eastern Parkway were co-named Jean-Jacques Dessalines Boulevard. The street co-naming was a tribute to Jean-Jacques Dessalines, a former slave who led Haiti to victory, making it the first Latin American country to declare independence from colonial rule, and the first Black republic. 

The Mattapan section of Boston is considered the main center of Haitians in the city, though there are many other parts of the Boston area with significant numbers of Haitians. Growing Haitian communities have also formed in many other cities in the Northeast, like Providence, Philadelphia and North Jersey (Newark/Jersey City), as well as Orlando in Central Florida. In such centers, everyday conversations on the street may take place in Haitian Creole. Second-generation Haitian Americans have begun to gain higher-paying occupations, such as doctors and lawyers, and achieve higher levels of education. Several Haitian Americans have become professional athletes, mostly in the National Football League.

Significant Haitian populations are located in the U.S. territories of Puerto Rico and the U.S. Virgin Islands. In Puerto Rico, Haitians receive refugee asylum, similar to the Wet feet, dry feet policy for Cubans going to Florida.

Youth 
Since the 1950s, a new generation of young Haitian immigrants have entered the nation's schools. They have been the fastest growing and most ethnically diverse segment of America's child population. These Haitian (American) youth are very diverse in the ways that they identify with Haiti and participate within their different communities.

These youth vary between those born in the U.S. of immigrant parents, those who immigrated with their families as small children, those who immigrated recently under duress (such as after the 2010 earthquake), and those who have come to attend colleges and universities. Many scholars refer to these Haitian youth as the “new second generation.” They say that identity formation among Haitian youth is based on many different factors, including first-generation modes of adaption, parental socio-economic status, length and place of residency, certain social constructions of a pluralistic American society (such as racism), as well as others.

Education is a significant factor in the lives of Haitian American youth, particularly among those who aspire towards certain professions such as medicine and law. Many Haitian youth who immigrate have been trained in top Haitian middle schools, high schools, and colleges that prepare them for such pursuits. Because of this, many Haitian youth come to the United States in order to enter college. (See Harvard University’s Haitian Student Association for an example of a strong group of Haitian American and Haitian students). In other cases, parents who do not have access to high-quality schools in Haiti may move to the United States to offer their children better opportunities.

Haitian-American youth express themselves creatively in different ways. For many immigrants, creative expression allows a certain connection to Haiti that keeps them bound to their roots, and allows them to maintain a sense of pride for that country while abroad. They may speak French and Haitian Creole in friend circles and in places such as home and church. Cooking traditional Haitian food, following Haitian music and musicians, and participating in Haitian styles of dance are other ways to keep connected with their roots. These aspects of creative expression allow Haitian youth to maintain a strong tie to their Haitian communities that, while informed by an American experience, also adds elements and nuances to American culture.

Media and social media presence

The Relief Effort 
After the 2010 earthquake, the United States, the Government of Haiti and many countries around the world worked in tandem to manage global responses. The United States used social media platforms to keep up to date intel about the progress of relief/aid working in Haiti.

By the end of the first week of social media use, post earthquake, Haiti was the topic of one-third of all Twitter posts and the outlets to raise funds for relief aid had amassed $8 million.

Social media was also used to updates outside aid of on the ground happenings of relief for the subsequent Cholera outbreak. Haitian-Americans and Haitians living in the continental U.S. used social media listservs, such as Sakapfet (a web board on which Haitians can post what is happening where they are and where sought after people were last seen) to inquire about loved ones living on the island. Twitter also provided up to date information and continues to do so in the wake of Hurricane Matthew (October 2016). Twitter also serves as a platform for Haitian Americans to speak out against the above-mentioned U.S. aid.  Some  Haitian Americans argue that the donations amassed in 2010, have had little effect on actually changing and/or aiding Haiti. Also in the wake of Hurricane Matthew, Haitian Americans in Georgia and South Florida have created their own organizations, for example the Haitian American Nurses Association of Florida, to provide aid to Haiti, themselves.

Bloggers and social media 
Haitian-Americans have been taking advantage of digital technologies and developments since they become available; for example the employment of radio shows, such as Radyo Lekòl (or School Radio), to talk about Haitian life in an American context. In more recent times, however, Haitian Americans have taken to the internet as a forum. Many have sought to fill in, what they believe is, the void of diversity among influential social media users.

Demographics

U.S. states with largest Haitian populations
According to the 2019 U.S. Census, there were 1,084,055 Haitian Americans living in the U.S.

The 10 U.S. states with the largest Haitian populations in 2019 are:
 Florida - 533,409 (2.4% of the state population)
 New York - 192,007 (1.0% of the state population)
 Massachusetts - 83,791 (1.2% of the state population)
 New Jersey - 68,848 (0.8% of the state population)
 Georgia - 31,669 (0.3% of the state population)
 Pennsylvania - 24,953 (0.2% of the state population)
 Connecticut - 20,570 (0.6% of the state population)
 Maryland - 20,273 (0.3% of the state population)
 California - 13,344 (0.1% of the state population)
 Illinois - 9,606  (0.1% of the state population)

U.S. metropolitan areas with largest Haitian populations
The largest populations of Haitians are situated in the following metropolitan areas:
 Miami-Fort Lauderdale-West Palm Beach, FL MSA - 308,605
 New York-Northern New Jersey-Long Island, NY-NJ-PA-CT MSA - 222,193
 Boston-Cambridge-Quincy, MA-NH MSA - 65,658
 Orlando-Kissimmee-Sanford, FL MSA - 36,443
 Philadelphia-Camden-Wilmington, PA-NJ-DE-MD MSA - 17,884
 Atlanta-Sandy Springs-Marietta, GA MSA - 17,693
 Bridgeport-Stamford-Norwalk, CT MSA - 12,094
 Tampa-St. Petersburg-Clearwater, FL MSA - 11,554
 Washington-Arlington-Alexandria, DC-VA-MD-WV MSA - 10,187
 Jacksonville, FL MSA - 7,767

High percentages of Haitian ancestry by community 
The 36 U.S. communities in 2000 with the highest percentage of people claiming Haitian ancestry are:

Haitian Americans in politics 
In 2014, Congresswoman, Mia Love became the first Haitian American to be elected to the House of Representatives as well as the first Black female Republican. She had previously served as mayor of Saratoga Springs, Utah.

In 2014, Assemblymember Rodneyse Bichotte became the first Haitian-American woman to hold an elected office in New York City when she won the 42nd Assembly District seat. On January 20, 2020, Bichotte was overwhelmingly elected chair of the Kings County Democratic Party, thus becoming the first woman to lead the Brooklyn Democratic party, and the first Black woman to lead in any of the five boroughs of New York City. 

In 2019, Farah N. Louis joined the ranks of Haitian-American legislators in New York City when she became the first woman to represent the 45th Council District, which includes Flatbush, East Flatbush, Midwood, Marine Park, Flatlands, and Kensington in Brooklyn, New York.

In 2022, Sheila Cherfilus-McCormick became the first Haitian American to be elected to the House of Representatives representing Florida as well as the first Haitian-American Democratic congressperson.

Notable people

See also

 Haiti–United States relations
 Haitian Canadians
 Haitian diaspora
 Haitians
 Little Haiti
 Newkirk Avenue–Little Haiti station in Brooklyn, NY
 Little Haiti in East Flatbush, Brooklyn
 French Caribbean
 National Haitian Student Alliance
 West Indian Americans
 Dominican Americans
 History of the Haitians in Salisbury, Maryland

References

Further reading
 Cantave, Alix. "Incorporation or Symbiosis: Haitians and African Americans in Mattapan." Trotter Review 19.1 (2010): 7+ online.
 Chierici, Rose-Marie Cassagnol. Demele: 'Making It': Migration and Adaptation among Haitian Boat People in the United States (AMS, 1980).
 Laguerre, Michel S.  "Haitians" in Thernstrom, Stephan; Orlov, Ann; Handlin, Oscar, eds. Harvard Encyclopedia of American Ethnic Groups, Harvard University Press, pp 446–449, Online free to borrow 
 Laguerre, Michel S. Diasporic citizenship: Haitian Americans in transnational America (Springer, 2016).
 Laguerre, Michel S. American Odyssey: Haitians in New York City (Cornell UP, 1984)
 Laguerre, Michel S. The Complete Haitiana: A Bibliographic Guide to the Scholarly Literature, 1900–1980 (Kraus International Publications, 1982).
 Pierre-Louis, François. "A long journey from protest to incorporation: The political development of Haitians in New York City." Journal of Haitian Studies (2011): 52-72. online
 Unaeze, Felix Eme, and Richard E. Perrin. "Haitian Americans." Gale Encyclopedia of Multicultural America, edited by Thomas Riggs, (3rd ed., vol. 2, Gale, 2014), pp. 305-316. online
 Verna, Chantalle F. Haiti and the Uses of America: Post-US Occupation Promises (Rutgers UP, 2017).
 Zéphir, Flore. The Haitian Americans (Greenwood Press, 2004).

 
 
 
Haiti–United States relations
Caribbean American
Haitian diaspora